The following lists events that happened during 1993 in New Zealand.

Population
 Estimated Population as of 31 December: 3,597,800
 Increase since 31 December 1992: 45,600 (1.28%)
 Males per 100 Females: 97.1

Incumbents

Regal and viceregal
Head of State – Elizabeth II
Governor-General – The Hon Dame Catherine Tizard, GCMG, GCVO, DBE, QSO

Government
The 43rd New Zealand Parliament continued. Government was The National Party, led by Jim Bolger. National controlled nearly seventy percent of the seats in Parliament. In the 1993 New Zealand general election National was returned to power with a reduced majority.

Speaker of the House – Robin Gray then Peter Tapsell
Prime Minister – Jim Bolger
Deputy Prime Minister – Don McKinnon
Minister of Finance – Ruth Richardson then Bill Birch
Minister of Foreign Affairs – Don McKinnon
Chief Justice — Sir Thomas Eichelbaum

Parliamentary opposition
 Leader of the Opposition –  Mike Moore (Labour) until 1 December, then Helen Clark (Labour).
NewLabour Party – Jim Anderton until
Alliance – Jim Anderton. (after 6 November general election)New Zealand First: Winston Peters' (after the general election)

Main centre leaders
Mayor of Auckland – Les Mills
Mayor of Hamilton – Margaret Evans
Mayor of Wellington – Fran Wilde
Mayor of Christchurch – Vicki Buck
Mayor of Dunedin – Richard Walls

Events
 17 April – By-election in Tauranga after the National MP Winston Peters resigned from both his party and from Parliament. He recontested the seat as an independent and won it after no major political party stood a candidate.
 26 May – Disappearance from Karangahape Road in Auckland of 17-year-old Jayne Furlong.
 25 August – A concrete mixer truck fails to stop at a railway level crossing in Rolleston and hits the side of a southbound Southerner passenger train, killing three people on board and seriously injuring seven others.
 6 November
 The 1993 general election is held, with National losing its large majority to retain power by one seat.
 The 1993 voting method referendum is held, with a 53.9% majority voting to change to the Mixed Member Proportional (MMP) voting system.
 26 November – Auckland mid-air collision of police Eagle helicopter and a traffic spotting Piper Archer over the Auckland CBD, killing all occupants of both aircraft – two police and two civilians; debris falls on motorway.
 The Tonga Island Marine Reserve is established.

Arts and literature
Stuart Hoare wins the Robert Burns Fellowship.

See 1993 in art, 1993 in literature, :Category:1993 books

Music

New Zealand Music Awards
Winners are shown first with nominees underneath.
Album of the Year: The Mutton Birds – The Mutton Birds
Jan Hellriegel – It's My Sin
Shona Laing – New on Earth
Single of the Year: The Mutton Birds – Nature
Annie Crummer – See What Love Can Do
Greg Johnson Set – Isabelle
Best Male Vocalist: Greg Johnson
Jordan Luck
Paul Ubana Jones
Best Female Vocalist: Annie Crummer
Patsy Riggir
Shona Laing
Best Group: The Mutton Birds
Greg Johnson Set
The Exponents
Most Promising Male Vocalist: Ted Brown
Jay Rei
Kevin Greaves
Most Promising Female Vocalist: Jan Hellriegel
Jules Issa
Maree Sheehan
Most Promising Group: Head Like a Hole
Dead Flowers
Kantuta
Best Producer: Nigel Stone / Annie Crummer – See What Love Can Do
Angus McNaughton – Donde Esta La Pollo
Nick Morgan – It's My Sin
Best Engineer: Nigel Stone – See What Love Can Do (Annie Crummer)
Graeme Myhre – New on Earth
Nick Morgan/ Graeme Myhre/ John Harvey – It's My Sin
Best Video: Kerry Brown / Bruce Sheridan – Four Seasons in One Day (Crowded House)
Fane Flaws & The Mutton Birds/ Sycorax Films – Nature (The Mutton Birds)
Nigel Streeter – Fish Across Face (Head Like A Hole)
Best International Performer: Jenny Morris
Dame Malvina Major
Shona Laing
Best Songwriter: Jan Hellriegel – It's My Sin
David Kilgour – You Forget
Jordan Luck – Something Beginning With C
Best Māori Album: Southside of Bombay – All Across The World
Hinewehi Mohe – Kia U
Te Hei O Tahoka – Ahorangi Genesis
Best Cover: Shaun Pettigrew – Kantuta
David Mitchell – Hellzapoppin
Jan Hellriegel – It's My Sin
Best Country Album: Barry Saunders – Long Shadows
Brendan Dugan – All This Time
Patsy Riggir – Moonlight & Roses
Best Gospel Album: Wanganui Collegiate & South Wairarapa Singers – Faure Requiem
Steve Apirana – No Turning Back
St Paul's Collegiate – School Music
Best Classical Album:  Dame Malvina Major – Dame Malvina in Concert
Dame Malvina Major – I Remember
NZ National Youth Choir – NZ National Youth Choir
Best Folk Album: Claddagh – Continental Drift
Paul Ubana Jones – The Things Which Touch Me So
Rua – Live in the Cathedral
Best Jazz Album: Broadhurst / Hopkins / Haines – Live at the London Bar
The Inner City Jazz Workshop – Live in Concert
Malcolm McNeill – Skylark
Best Polynesian Album: Annie Crummer – Language
Harbour Light Express – Ua Ou Misia Oe
Mere Darling – Rarotonga Waits For Me
Samoan AOG – Foi Maia I Le Alii

See: 1993 in music

Performing arts

 Benny Award presented by the Variety Artists Club of New Zealand to Mary Throll and Rob Guest OBE.

Radio and television
See: 1993 in New Zealand television, 1993 in television, List of TVNZ television programming, :Category:Television in New Zealand, TV3 (New Zealand), :Category:New Zealand television shows, Public broadcasting in New Zealand

FilmDesperate RemediesMap of the Human HeartThe Piano''

See: :Category:1993 film awards, 1993 in film, List of New Zealand feature films, Cinema of New Zealand, :Category:1993 films

Internet
See: NZ Internet History

Sport

Athletics
Paul Herlihy wins his second national title in the men's marathon, clocking 2:15:50 in Invercargill, while Gabrielle O'Rourke claims her first in the women's championship (2:38:23).

Horse racing

Harness racing
 New Zealand Trotting Cup: Chokin
 Auckland Trotting Cup: Chokin

Thoroughbred racing

Rugby league

Canterbury retained the Rugby League Cup throughout the season.
Canterbury defeated Auckland 36–12 in the National Provincial Competition final.
20 June, New Zealand drew with Australia 14-all
25 June, New Zealand lost to Australia 8–16
30 June, New Zealand lost to Australia 4–16
4 October, New Zealand defeated Wales 24-19
16 October, New Zealand lost to Great Britain 0–17
30 October, New Zealand lost to Great Britain 12–29
6 November, New Zealand lost to Great Britain 10–29
21 November, New Zealand defeated France 36-11

Shooting
Ballinger Belt – Ross Collings (Karori)

Soccer
 The Chatham Cup is won by Napier City Rovers who beat Christchurch Rangers 6–0 in the final.

Births

January
 1 January – Randa, rapper
 8 January – Sophie Pascoe, Paralympic swimmer
 10 January – David Bhana, rugby league player
 13 January – Storm Roux, association footballer
 15 January – Justin Gulley, association footballer
 16 January – Mary Fisher, Paralympic swimmer
 17 January – Lolagi Visinia, rugby union player
 20 January – Tom Biss, association footballer
 23 January – Patrick Tuipulotu, rugby union player
 24 January – Albert Vete, rugby league player

February
 9 February – Daniel Lienert-Brown, rugby union player
 10 February – Melody Tan, singer
 11 February – Chris Vui, rugby union player
 15 February – Stephanie McKenzie, racing cyclist
 18 February – Siliva Havili, rugby league player
 23 February – Mitch Renwick, cricketer
 25 February
 Edwin Maka, rugby union player
 Nesiasi Mataitonga, rugby league player
 28 February – Matthew Quinn, cricketer

March
 1 March – Cam Fletcher, cricketer
 2 March – Pieter Bulling, racing cyclist
 3 March – Dion Smith, road cyclist
 12 March – Ruby Livingstone, racing cyclist
 14 March
 Michael Little, rugby union player
 Katherine Westbury, tennis player
 20 March – Cameron Clark, rugby union player
 25 March – Jordan Payne, rugby union player
 30 March – Mitch Clark, rugby league player
 31 March – Molly Meech, sailor

April
 2 April – Matthew Small, water polo player
 3 April – Louis Fenton, association football player
 7 April – Jacob Skeen, rugby union player
 13 April
 Matthew Bacon, cricketer
 Reid McGowan, gymnast
 14 April – Sione Mafileo, rugby union player
 17 April – Portia Bing, heptathlete
 18 April – Siliva Havili, rugby league player
 3 April – Louis Fenton, footballer
 5 April – Hikule'o Malu, rugby league player
 14 April – Rhiannon Dennison, field hockey player
 17 April – Hamish Watson, association footballer
 18 April – Scott Scrafton, rugby union player
 20 April – Storm Purvis, netball player
 22 April – Ngani Laumape, rugby league player
 29 April
 Jamie Gibson, cricketer
 Stephen Jones, rower

May
 5 May – Briana Mitchell, artistic gymnast
 8 May – Jordan Manihera, rugby union player
 15 May – Jeremy Hawkins, rugby league player
 16 May – Michael Sio, rugby league player
 25 May – Teihorangi Walden, rugby union player
 31 May – Jason Taumalolo, rugby league player

June
 3 June – Michael Collins, rugby union player
 5 June – Roger Tuivasa-Sheck, rugby league player
 6 June
 Jack Debreczeni, rugby union player
 Rosie White, association footballer
 8 June – Lausii Taliauli, rugby union player
 10 June – Scott McLaughlin, motor racing driver
 16 June – Samuel Blakely, cricketer
 17 June
 James Oram, cyclist
 Rebekah Stott, association footballer
 18 June
 Alex Frame, racing cyclist
 Jamie-Jerry Taulagi, rugby union player
 Jade Te Rure, rugby union player
 20 June – Abraham Papalii, rugby league player
 29 June – Caleb Shepherd, rowing coxswain

July
 2 July – Tayla Ford, amateur wrestler
 14 July – Julia Ratcliffe, hammer thrower
 15 July – Edward Nuttall, cricketer
 16 July – Alex Hodgman, rugby union player
 20 July – Steven Adams, basketball player
 26 July
 Raymond Faitala-Mariner, rugby league player
 Sarah Landry, water polo player
 Theo van Woerkom, cricketer

August
 6 August – Alexandra Rout, figure skater
 12 August – Max Crocombe, association footballer
 15 August – Mitchell Brown, rugby union player
 20 August – Anjali Mulari, ice hockey and inline hockey player
 23 August – Jaime Ridge, socialite
 25 August – Georgia Williams, racing cyclist
 27 August – Joe Webber, rugby union player
 31 August – Great Command, thoroughbred racehorse

September
 5 September – Sione Molia, rugby union player
 21 September
 Joe Edwards, rugby union player
 Jason Emery, rugby union player
 27 September
 Massad Barakat-Devine, musician
 Liam Higgins, association footballer

October
 2 October – Daniel Franks, BMX rider
 5 October – Olivia Chance, association footballer
 6 October – Might and Power, thoroughbred racehorse
 13 October – Blair Tickner, cricketer
 14 October – Ardie Savea, rugby union player
 27 October – Denny Solomona, rugby league player

November
 6 November – Carina Doyle, swimmer
 12 November – Kurtis Rowe, rugby league player
 14 November
 Jackson Hemopo, rugby union player
 Hymel Hunt, rugby league player
 15 November – Allan Fa'alava'au, rugby union player
 16 November – Devy Dyson, gymnast
 17 November – Chris Feauai-Sautia, rugby union player
 20 November
 Scott Barrett, rugby union player
 Junior Paulo, rugby league player
 24 November – Tayler Adams, rugby union player
 26 November – Georgia Guy, cricketer
 27 November – Toa Halafihi, rugby union player
 30 November – Lyell Creek, standardbred racehorse

December
 18 December – Kerri Gowler, rower
 26 December – Taleni Seu, rugby union player

Full date unknown
 Jessica Clarke, fashion model
 Daniel McBride, musician

Deaths

January–March
 1 January – Sir Kingi Ihaka, Anglican priest, broadcaster, Māori leader (born 1921)
 6 January – Cole Wilson, musician (born 1922)
 7 January – John Crichton, furniture and interior designer (born 1917)
 10 January – Bill Gray, rugby union player (born 1932)
 13 January – Bob Smith, rower (born 1909)
 14 January – Venn Young, politician (born 1929)
 27 January 
 Alan Geddes, athlete (born 1912)
 Mary Rouse, cricketer (born 1926)
 30 January – James LuValle, athlete, scientist (born 1912)
 5 February – Tommy Adderley, singer (born 1940)
 10 February
 Fred Hollows, ophthalmologist (born 1929)
 Nancy Russell, speech teacher (born 1909)
 17 February – Leslie Townsend, cricketer (born 1903)
 27 February – John Hippolite, activist (born 1929)
 5 March – Sir Colin Allan, colonial official, diplomat, author (born 1921)
 8 March – Tui Mayo, nurse, politician (born 1905)
 11 March – Tibor Donner, architect (born 1907)
 12 March
 Lewis Johnston, cricket umpire (born 1917)
 Robin Morrison, photographer (born 1944)
 26 March – Edwin Norton, weightlifter (born 1926)
 28 March – Jelal Natali, community leader, anti-racism activist (born 1899)
 31 March – Wharetutu Stirling, Ngāi Tahu leader, conservationist (born 1924)

April–June
 2 April – Ted Chamberlain, plant pathologist (born 1906)
 4 April – Sir Charles Elworthy, Baron Elworthy, air force officer (born 1911)
 15 April – Herbert Dudley Purves, medical researcher (born 1908)
 17 April – Doris Palmer, political activist, welfare worker (born 1898)
 21 April – Lincoln Hurring, swimmer (born 1931)
 28 April – Sir Monita Delamere, rugby union player, Māori leader (born 1921)
 29 April – Cyril Kay, aviator, military leader (born 1902)
 22 May – Colleen Dewe, politician (born 1930)
 24 May – Eric Lee-Johnson, artist and photographer (born 1908)
 30 May – Frank Robson, marine conservationist (born 1912)
 3 June – Lester Harvey, rugby union player (born 1919)
 7 June – Rita Smith, communist, political activist (born 1912)
 10 June – Nellie Schroder, community leader (born 1903)
 20 June – Sir Keith Sinclair, historian (born 1922)

July–September
 7 July – Sir Alexander Turner, lawyer and jurist (born 1901)
 20 July – Harata Solomon, community leader (born 1925)
 26 July – Phyllis Williams, singer (born 1905)
 28 July – Vincent McCarten, cricketer (born 1913)
 3 August – Sir Laurie Francis, diplomat, lawyer (born 1918)
 4 August – Sir Harcourt Caughey, rugby union player, businessman (born 1911)
 7 August – Paul Little, rugby union player (born 1934)
 9 August – Jack Parker, boxer (born 1915)
 10 August – Mike Bungay, lawyer (born 1934)
 24 August – James Bertram, journalist, writer, university academic (born 1910)
 25 August – Florence James, author and literary agent (born 1902)
 7 September – Guy Overton, cricketer (born 1919)
 17 September – John Robson, public servant, penal reformer (born 1909)
 18 September – Rodger Freeth, motorsport competitor (born 1953)
 24 September – Monte Holcroft, essayist and novelist (born 1902)

October–December
 1 October
 Mabel Corby, cricketer (born 1913)
 Tom Marshall, Christian writer (born 1921)
 4 October – Fred Lucas, military and commercial pilot, farmer, tourist operator (born 1915)
 8 October – Gu Cheng, writer (born 1956)
 17 October – Gordon Grieve, politician (born 1912)
 19 October – Ring the Bell, thoroughbred racehorse (foaled 1977)
 1 November – Sir Arthur Ward, dairy researcher, university administrator (born 1906)
 3 November – Redmond Phillips, actor, writer (born 1912)
 6 November – Zena Abbott, weaver (born 1922)
 19 November – Sir John Stallworthy, obstetrician (born 1906)
 20 November – Eve van Grafhorst, HIV/AIDS sufferer and community figure (born 1982)
 11 December – Bill Mumm, rugby union player, politician (born 1922)
 12 December – Ned Barry, rugby union player (born 1905)
 24 December – Dorrie Parker, athlete (born 1928)
 28 December – John Kemp, association footballer (born 1940)

See also
List of years in New Zealand
Timeline of New Zealand history
History of New Zealand
Military history of New Zealand
Timeline of the New Zealand environment
Timeline of New Zealand's links with Antarctica

References

 
New Zealand
Years of the 20th century in New Zealand